Omari Ishmael Grandberry (born November 12, 1984), better known by his stage name Omarion, is an American R&B singer, songwriter, actor and dancer. He rose to prominence as the lead singer of the boy band B2K. The group achieved success in the early 2000s with their singles "Gots ta Be", "Uh Huh", "Girlfriend", and the number-one hit "Bump, Bump, Bump".

After the group disbanded in 2004, Omarion embarked on a solo career, with the release of his debut solo album, O (2005), which debuted at the top of the Billboard 200 chart. He was also featured on the single "Let Me Hold You" by Bow Wow, which reached the top 10 on the Billboard Hot 100. O received a Grammy Award nomination for Best Contemporary R&B Album at the 48th Annual Grammy Awards.

His second solo album, 21 (2006), became his second chart topper in the United States, and spawned the hit single "Ice Box". He released his third solo album, Ollusion in 2010. His fourth solo album, Sex Playlist (2014), spawned the single "Post to Be" (featuring Chris Brown and Jhené Aiko), which reached the top 20 on the Billboard Hot 100 and was certified 3× platinum by the Recording Industry Association of America (RIAA).

Omarion has also ventured into acting, with appearances in films such as You Got Served, Fat Albert, Somebody Help Me and The Proud Family Movie. As a solo artist, he has received a BET Award, a Billboard Music Award, and a Soul Train Music Award.

Early life and career
Omarion was born Omari Ishmael Grandberry on November 12, 1984, in Inglewood, California to Leslie Burrell and Trent Grandberry. His younger brother, O'Ryan, is also a singer. He appeared in commercials for both Kellogg's Corn Pops and McDonald's. He started his dancing career as a background dancer for the R&B girl group Before Dark and appeared in their music videos. Omarion soon began pursuing a career in music, and would go on to become the lead singer of the boy band B2K.

1999–2004: B2K
Omari joined the group B2K in 1999 and took the stage name Omarion. The group named themselves B2K, an acronym for "Boys of The New Millennium". They began touring with Lil Bow Wow and eventually released their debut single, "Uh Huh", in 2001. They soon after released their debut album, the self-titled B2K, on March 12, 2002. The album peaked at No. 2 on the Billboard 200 and No. 1 on the Top R&B/Hip-Hop albums chart. They followed the album up in December with their second album, Pandemonium!, supported by their most successful single, "Bump, Bump, Bump" featuring P. Diddy. The single peaked at No. 1 on the Billboard Hot 100. This would prove to be the group's last album, as they would disband in early 2004.

2004–2008: O, 21, and Face Off
In early 2004, Omarion appeared in several films, most notably You Got Served, in which he starred alongside Marques Houston, as well as his former B2K bandmates. The movie centered on a group of friends in a hip hop dance crew who take part in underground dance competitions. That same year, he played the role of the school bully "Reggie" in the comedy Fat Albert, based on the animated series Fat Albert and the Cosby Kids. On February 22, 2005, Omarion released his debut solo album, O. The album debuted at No. 1 on the Billboard 200 and Top R&B/Hip-Hop Albums charts. The first single from the album was "O". The single peaked at No. 27 on the Billboard Hot 100 chart. The second single, "Touch", peaked at No. 94 on the Billboard Hot 100. The album received a third and final release with "I'm Tryna". O has sold over 758,000 copies in the United States since its release. Omarion received a Grammy nomination for the album at the 48th Annual Grammy Awards for Best Contemporary R&B Album. On December 26, 2006, Omarion released his second album, 21. The album debuted at No. 1 on the Billboard 200 and Top R&B/Hip-Hop Albums charts. The first single from the album was "Entourage". The second single, "Ice Box", produced by Timbaland, peaked at No. 12 on the Billboard Hot 100 and is Omarion's most successful solo single to date, reaching gold certification by the RIAA. 21 has sold over 390,000 copies in the United States since its release.

Towards the end of 2007, he displayed his acting skills in the thriller Somebody Help Me. This movie was released exclusively on DVD and aired on BET in celebration of Halloween. Omarion has also made several appearances in a number of TV shows, including One on One. Omarion also played the voice of Fifteen Cent in The Proud Family Movie. His portrayal of a rapper who gets involved with thugs in the movie Feel the Noise, which he co-produced, received mixed reviews from critics. In late 2007, Omarion and Bow Wow recorded a collaboration album titled Face Off. The album sold over 100,000 copies in its first week and went on to sell over 500,000 copies, reaching gold certification by the RIAA. The first single from the album was "Girlfriend", followed up by "Hey Baby" as the second single.

2009-2010: EMI and Ollusion
On March 30, 2009, Lil Wayne confirmed that Omarion was affiliated (though not officially signed) with Young Money Entertainment. Four months later, he parted ways with the label; both Lil Wayne and Omarion confirmed that his departure had been for business reasons. Omarion then signed with EMI and created his own label, StarrWorld Entertainment. He later re-released the single "I Get It In" with Lil Wayne replaced by Gucci Mane. In January 2010, Omarion released his second single, "Speedin'". That same month, he released his third studio album, Ollusion, which sold 19,400 copies in its first week. Omarion also became a judge on the fifth season of America's Best Dance Crew, replacing former judge Shane Sparks. He left after Season 5 to focus on his music career.

2011–2017: Sex Playlist
In early 2011, Omarion worked on his first mixtape presented by DJ Drama, titled The Awakening. Originally set to be released on April 27, 2011, the mixtape was instead released on May 11, 2011. In November 2011, Omarion was seen on set with Japanese star Koda Kumi. On December 6, 2011, it was revealed that he collaborated with the star on the song "Slow" for her 2012 album Japonesque and appeared in the music video. On May 2, 2012, Omarion signed with Rick Ross label Maybach Music Group and Warner Bros. Records. He then appeared on Self Made Vol. 2, which made the Top 10 on the Billboard 200. Also in 2012, Omarion signed to Jay-Z's Roc Nation Management. On November 29, 2012, he released his debut EP, Care Package. September 2013 saw the release of Self Made Vol. 3 featuring Omarion, which also reached the Top 10 on Billboard 200 at number 4. Care Package 2, his second EP, was released on November 5, 2013.

On February 14, 2014, he released "You Like It", the first single in promotion of his fourth studio album, Sex Playlist. On August 18, Omarion was cast to be a part of Love & Hip Hop: Hollywood along with his mother, and girlfriend Apryl Jones while awaiting the arrival of their first child. In November 2014, he released a second single, "Post to Be", featuring Chris Brown and Jhené Aiko. Sex Playlist was released on December 2, 2014. "Post to Be" gained substantial commercial success, reaching No. 13 on the Billboard Hot 100. The song peaked in the top ten on the Urban Radio chart, the Rhythmic chart, and the Hot R&B/Hip-Hop Songs chart, reaching gold status by the RIAA in May 2015. The song also won him a Soul Train Music Award for Best Collaboration.

In June 2015, Omarion stated in an interview that he wanted to open his own dance studio by the end of the year. He released his third EP, Care Package 3 on November 12, 2015. November 2017 was met with the release of the fourth EP, Care Package 4. Omarion released the song "Distance" in 2017, for which he filmed a music video in South Africa.

2018-present: The Millennium Tour and The Kinection
In 2018, he was featured on the track "Tell Me" from Anatii's album Artiifact. That same year, he also appeared in the "Get It Now" remix music video by Tiwa Savage as a featured artist.

In 2019, B2K briefly reformed to go on The Millennium Tour; joined by supporting acts Mario, Ying Yang Twins, Chingy, Pretty Ricky, Bobby V and Lloyd. The tour kicked off on March 8 in Pittsburgh, Pennsylvania and wrapped up on April 28 in Louisville, Kentucky. It was later announced that Omarion would be continuing The Millennium Tour without his bandmates and with Bow Wow and other acts added to the lineup for 2020 dates. The group was nominated for Top R&B Tour at the 2020 Billboard Music Awards.

In 2020, Omarion released the single "Can You Hear Me?" featuring a guest verse from T-Pain. The single was announced as the lead song from Omarion's fifth album, The Kinection. On October 29, Omarion presents Thriller Night premiered on YouTube in celebration of the album release. The event included Prince Jackson live from Michael Jackson's Hayvenhurst Estate. Omarion released The Kinection on October 30, 2020.

In 2021, Omarion competed in season five of The Masked Singer as the wild card contestant "Yeti". Certain performances have the Yeti's feet swapped out with different footwear. He finished in fourth place.

On May 31, 2021, "We Will Never Forget" with Omarion, Lalah Hathaway, and Kierra Sheard was released by being featured in the documentary film, Dreamland: The Burning of Black Wall Street which was executive produced by LeBron James, with all proceeds going to Color of Change.

Omarion headlined The Millennium Tour in the fall of 2021 and concurrently released a single with Soulja Boy and Bow Wow titled "EX" from his forthcoming album Sex Playlist 2, which he announced through Songtrust. He was nominated for Top R&B Tour and Top Rap Tour at the 2022 Billboard Music Awards, winning the latter award alongside Bow Wow. On June 23, 2022, he did a Verzuz on season 2 with Mario. He soon after announced his new book, Unbothered: The Power Of Choosing Joy, his second book after 2005's O, which was published by MTV. He also announced a new 5-part docuseries called, Omega: The Gift and the Curse, set for pay-per-view release on July 21, 2022 via the website Omarion Worldwide. In March 2023, the documentary was aired in a five part event on both We TV and Allblk after 2020's partnership with Zeus Network to premiere the film fell through due to the company allegedly withholding unaired footage.

Personal life
Omarion has two children, a son born in 2014 and a daughter born in 2016, with ex-girlfriend Apryl Jones, whom he dated from 2013 to 2016. Their relationship was chronicled on Love & Hip Hop: Hollywood.

Discography

Studio albums
 O (2005)
 21 (2006)
 Ollusion (2010)
 Sex Playlist (2014)
 The Kinection (2020)
 Full Circle (2023)

Collaboration albums
 B2K (with B2K) (2002)
 Pandemonium! (with B2K) (2002)
 Face Off (with Bow Wow) (2007)

Filmography

Films

Television

Tours
 Scream Tour I (2001)
 Scream Tour II (2002)
 Scream Tour III (2003)
 Scream Tour IV (2005-2006)
 Scream Tour V (2006)
 The Millennium Tour (2019-2021)

Awards and nominations

 African Muzik Magazine Awards

|-
|[African Muzik Magazine Awards|2018
|Diamond Platnumz Feat Omarion - "African Beauty"
|Best Collaboration
|
|}
 African Entertainment Awards

|-
|[African Entertainment Awards|2018
|Diamond Platnumz Feat Omarion - "African Beauty"
|Best Collaboration
|
|}
 American Music Awards

|-
|2005
|Himself
|Favorite Soul/R&B Male Artist
|
|}
 BET Awards

|-
|rowspan=2|2005
|Himself
|Best New Artist
|
|-
|"O"
|Viewer's Choice
|
|}
 Billboard Music Awards

|-
|2016
|"Post to Be" (Featuring Chris Brown & Jhene Aiko)
|Top R&B Song
|
|-
|2020
|The Millennium Tour (with B2K)
|Top R&B Tour
|
|-
|rowspan=2|2022
|rowspan=2|The Millennium Tour (alongside Bow Wow)
|Top Rap Tour
|
|-
|Top R&B Tour
|
|}
 Urban Music Awards

|-
|2007
|Himself
|Most Inspiring Act
|
|}
 NAACP Image Awards

|-
|2006
|Himself
|Outstanding New Artist
|
|-
|2008
| Omarion with Bow Wow
|Outstanding Duo or Group
|
|}
 Grammy Awards

|-
|2006
|O
|Best Contemporary R&B Album
|
|}
 iHeartRadio Music Awards

|-
|2016
|"Post to Be" (featuring Chris Brown & Jhene Aiko)
|R&B Song of the Year
|
|}
 MTV Movie Awards

|-
|rowspan=2|2004
|rowspan=2|You Got Served
|Best Male Breakthrough Performance
|
|-
|Best Dance Sequence with Marques Houston
|
|}
 Soul Train Music Awards

|-
|2015
|"Post to Be" (Featuring Chris Brown & Jhene Aiko)
|Best Collaboration
|
|}
 Teen Choice Awards

|-
|2004
|You Got Served
|Choice Breakout Movie Star – Male
|
|-
|rowspan=3|2005
|"O"
|Choice Music: Make-Out Song
|
|-
|Himself
|Choice Music: R&B Artist
|
|-
|"Touch"
|Choice Music: R&B Track
|
|-
|2008
|"Hey Baby (Jump Off)" w/ Bow Wow
|Choice Music: R&B Track
|
|}

References

External links
 
 

1984 births
Living people
21st-century American male actors
21st-century American rappers
21st-century American singers
African-American male actors
African-American male dancers
African-American male rappers
African-American male singers
African-American male singer-songwriters
African-American record producers
Alexander Hamilton High School (Los Angeles) alumni
American contemporary R&B singers
American male film actors
American male pop singers
American male rappers
American male singer-songwriters
American male television actors
American male voice actors
B2K members
Cash Money Records artists
EMI Records artists
Epic Records artists
Male actors from California
Male actors from Inglewood, California
Musicians from Inglewood, California
Participants in American reality television series
People from Inglewood, California
Rappers from California
Record producers from California
Roc Nation artists
Singer-songwriters from California